Ceikiniai is a village in the Ignalina district municipality, Utena county, Lithuania. It is 12 kilometres southeast from Ignalina. 

The village is situated at the confluence of Ceikinė and Kretuona. It is surrounded by pine forests and hills. Around 4 kilometres north of the town is the Nevaišiai hill, the fourth 4th tallest mountain in Lithuania.

References

External links 
 History and maps 
 Ceikiniai information

Villages in Utena County
Sventsyansky Uyezd
Wilno Voivodeship (1926–1939)
Ignalina District Municipality